Neptunea lyrata, also known by the common names New England Neptune, wrinkled whelk, ribbed Neptune, inflated whelk, lyre whelk  or lyre Neptune, is a species of large sea snail, a marine gastropod mollusk in the family Buccinidae, and is the state shell of Massachusetts.  This species consists of several subspecies.

The New England Neptune (Neptunea lyrata decemcostata) was declared the state seashell of Massachusetts in 1987.

Subspecies 
 Neptunea lyrata altispira
 Neptunea lyrata lyrata Gmelin, 1791 - lyre whelk
 Neptunea lyrata decemcostata (Say, 1826) – wrinkled whelk or New England Neptune – synonyms: Chrysodomus decemcostata (Say, 1826); Tritonium decemcostata (Say, 1826); Fusus decemcostatus Say, 1826; Neptunea turnerae Clarke, 1956
 Neptunea lyrata turnerae Clarke, 1956

Distribution 
Neptunea lyrata occurs in the Western Atlantic Ocean.

References

External links 
 Neptunea lyrata at National Center for Biotechnology Information website
 image of Neptunea lyrata decemcostata
 Photos

Buccinidae
Gastropods described in 1791
Taxa named by Johann Friedrich Gmelin